Quel bravo ragazzo is a 2016 Italian comedy film directed by Enrico Lando.

Cast

References

External links

2016 films
Films directed by Enrico Lando
2010s Italian-language films
2016 comedy films
Italian comedy films
2010s Italian films
Mafia comedy films